Gostiny dvor is a historic Russian term for an indoor market or shopping centre.

The term Gostiny Dvor may refer to:

 Arkhangelsk Gostiny Dvor, a network of fortified depots built in Arkhangelsk, Russia
 Great Gostiny Dvor, the oldest and largest shopping centre in St. Petersburg, Russia
 Gostiny Dvor (Saint Petersburg Metro), a station on the Nevsko-Vasileostrovskaya line near the shopping centre
 Kostroma Gostiny Dvor, the best preserved complex of provincial Neoclassical trading arcades in Russia
 Moscow Gostiny Dvor, the Old Merchant Court in Moscow, Russia
 Hostynnyi Dvir (Kyiv), the Neoclassical trade center in Kyiv, Ukraine